Odonestis pruni is a species of moth, belonging to the family Lasiocampidae. It was first described by Carl Linnaeus in his landmark 1758 10th edition of Systema Naturae.

It is native to Eurasia.

References

Lasiocampidae
Moths described in 1758